Zemfira Aliyevna Meftahatdinova (born 28 May 1963) is a retired Azerbaijani sport shooter who won two Olympic medals in skeet.

Meftahatdinova is a police officer and sports teacher and speaks three languages. In November 2002, she received a scholarship from the Olympic Solidarity program.

In 2015, she was appointed head of the Athletic Society of the Ministry of Internal Affairs.

Olympic results

References

1963 births
Living people
Azerbaijani female sport shooters
Shooters at the 2000 Summer Olympics
Shooters at the 2004 Summer Olympics
Shooters at the 2008 Summer Olympics
Azerbaijani people of Tatar descent
Olympic shooters of Azerbaijan
Olympic gold medalists for Azerbaijan
Olympic bronze medalists for Azerbaijan
Skeet shooters
World record holders in shooting
Sportspeople from Baku
Olympic medalists in shooting
Medalists at the 2004 Summer Olympics
Azerbaijani educators
Soviet female sport shooters
Soviet Azerbaijani people
Tatar sportspeople

Medalists at the 2000 Summer Olympics